Outzone is an Action / Strategy game published by Lankhor in 1991. The player controls a spacecraft whose role is to escort and protect a smaller one. The small spacecraft is moving at a constant speed right in front of the player's craft, which must destroy or avoid obstacles. The game requires both thought and reflexes.

References

External links
http://www.lankhor.net/

1991 video games
Action video games
Strategy video games
Atari ST games
Amiga games
Commodore 64 games
Video games developed in France
Lankhor games
Single-player video games